Tolka Park is an Irish football ground located in the north Dublin suburb of Drumcondra, on the northern banks of the River Tolka. It is currently the home ground of League of Ireland club Shelbourne. The stadium formerly held 9,680 people, but this has been scaled down in recent times due to health and safety regulations in the venue, mainly concerning the 'New' and Ballybough stands.  Tolka Park has hosted national cup finals along with international matches, Champions League qualifiers, UEFA Cup, UEFA Cup Winners' Cup ties and was a venue for the 1994 UEFA European Under-16 Championship and 2000 Rugby League World Cup.

Its future is currently uncertain due to the sale of the ground by Shelbourne to businessman Ossie Kilkenny in 2006, the purchase of the ground by Dublin City Council in 2015, with the proposal to redevelop Dalymount Park as a shared home for Shelbourne and Bohemian F.C., and with Shelbourne's proposal to reacquire ownership of the ground.

History
Over the years, seven different League of Ireland clubs have used Tolka Park for home league matches on a regular basis. They are Drumcondra, Shelbourne, Dolphin, Home Farm, Dublin City, Shamrock Rovers and St James Gate F.C.

Home Farm Drums
Tolka Park was originally home to Drumcondra, who in the 1950s, and 1960s were one of the most popular teams in Dublin  . In 1929, over 30 people were injured at the ground when a hoarding collapsed at a Drumcondra vs Shelbourne cup-tie. The ground hosted its first floodlit game on 30 March 1953. However "Drums" merged with local team Home Farm in 1972, and after the demise of Drumcondra, Home Farm moved into the ground. However, Home Farm never drew large crowds and Tolka fell into disrepair (though it did host the replay of the 1984 FAI Cup final).

Shelbourne F.C.
In 1989, Shelbourne, who had played home games regularly in Tolka during the fifties, sixties, seventies, and early eighties, acquired Home Farm's long term lease from Dublin Corporation on the ground. Home Farm moved to their own ground in nearby Whitehall Stadium. Shelbourne invested heavily in the stadium, converting it into Ireland's first all-seater stadium and building a new stand behind the Drumcondra end goal in 1999.

The first-ever League of Ireland match to be broadcast live on TV was a fixture between Shelbourne and Derry City, staged at Tolka Park during the 1996/97 season.

However, Shelbourne FC ran into several severe problems that have put the future of Tolka Park in doubt. One problem was a flood in 2000 that caused extensive damage to the pitch and greatly increased the club's insurance costs. But a far more serious long-term problem was caused by the club's getting into severe debt through overspending on playing staff. In 2006, Ollie Byrne, Shelbourne Chief Executive sold the ground to property developer Ossie Kilkenny to help repay the club's debts.  Shelbourne are still playing at  the venue but its future is uncertain. Legal action between the parties who bought the ground delayed its demolition and development, as has a slowdown in the Irish property market. By 2011, the club were reporting that the ground was in need of maintenance.

Shamrock Rovers F.C.
In 1987, the then owners of Shamrock Rovers, the Kilcoyne family, attempted to move the club to Tolka Park. Rovers played there for a season, but the games were boycotted by some of their fans, who were trying to save Glenmalure Park from demolition.

Rovers returned to the ground in 1996 which they rented for a time from Shelbourne on and off (1996–1999, 2001–2002, 2004–2005 and 2006–2008) while Tallaght Stadium was being developed. They eventually moved into the Tallaght Stadium in 2009. Rovers' home tie against Sligo Rovers during the 2009 season was moved to Tolka Park amid safety concerns due to construction on site at Tallaght before the club friendly against Real Madrid.

Ireland Football
Tolka Park has staged two full internationals for the Republic of Ireland men in 1981 and 1993. Both matches were friendlies against Wales.

Women's football
Anne O'Brien scored a hat-trick at Tolka Park in 1971, as her Vards team beat St John Bosco 3–2 in the final of the Drumcondra Cup. Tolka Park hosted the 2010 FAI Women's Cup final, in which Áine O'Gorman scored a hat-trick to help Peamount United beat Salthill Devon 4–2. The Republic of Ireland women have sporadically played games at Tolka Park including a 0–0 friendly draw against France in September 1978 and a 1–0 1999 FIFA Women's World Cup qualification (UEFA) defeat by Poland in November 1997.

In March 2019 Shelbourne's women's team announced that they would play their home fixtures at Tolka Park, instead of the smaller AUL Complex. In October 2021 the TG4 Irish language television network broadcast the first ever Women's National League match. Alex Kavanagh scored the goal in Shelbourne's 1–0 win over DLR Waves at Tolka Park.

Rugby League
The Irish Rugby League Team have also played home games at the ground and hosted two games of the 2000 Rugby League World Cup.

Other Uses
From 1999 to 2002 it hosted the FAI Cup final until the fixture was shifted to Lansdowne Road. The stadium hosted the first Setanta Cup Final when Linfield defeated Shelbourne. Tolka hosted two games in the 2011 UEFA Regions' Cup.

In August 1938, September 1939 and April 1947 it held boxing championship bouts.

Current layout

Richmond Road
The Richmond Road Stand or Main Stand runs the length of the north side of the pitch. The Technical area is located at the stand as well as the Box office, Stadium Bar and First aid area. The stand is named after Richmond Road which is directly behind the stand.

Riverside Stand
The Riverside Stand runs the length of the south side of the pitch. Today it is mainly used for Broadcasting and seating home fans. It is named after the River Tolka which is nearby.

Drumcondra Stand
The Drumcondra Stand or New Stand is located behind the goal at the west end of the ground and it is the most recent stand opened in 2000. The stand is named after the town of Drumcondra which is located behind the stand. The Ultras within the club's support base formerly congregated in the Drumcondra Stand, but it has been closed since 2019 as it was found to be unsafe. The Drumcondra stand also houses the dressing rooms. The club shop is located beside the stand.

Ballybough End
The Ballybough End is located behind the goal at the east end of the ground. It is named after the neighbourhood of Ballybough which is located behind the stand. The Ballybough stand has become neglected over the years due to the decreased attendance of Shelbourne and was deemed unsafe and closed by the Dublin Fire Brigade Health and Safety Unit in 2010.  The stand was reopened in time for the 2022 season to house away fans.  The broken seats that formerly occupied the stand were removed and replaced with standing barriers, transforming the lower half of the stand in to a terrace with a capacity of 800.  This may be increased in the future pending other infrastructural improvements.

References in popular culture
The ground has appeared in the fictional football drama Dream Team when Harchester United were drawn to play Shelbourne in the UEFA Cup.
The ground appeared in football comedy Fran where Fran's club St Peter's United lost a cup final held at Tolka Park.
 A chapter of Dermot Bolger's novel, 'A Second Life', takes place in Tolka Park, during a European competition match in which Shelbourne overturn a first-leg defeat over Ukrainian side, Karpaty Lvov, and the novel's narrator and his young son are ushered off the pitch by Ollie Byrne during a celebratory pitch invasion.

Future
Since the sale of Tolka Park in 2006, Shelbourne have been trying to relocate to a new ground. Plans for a new stadium in Finglas and Swords came to nothing, as has an FAI-backed proposed groundshare with North Dublin neighbours Bohemians. Plans were underway in March and April 2015 for the Council to take back ownership of the land, and for Shelbourne to groundshare Bohemians in (newly Council-owned) Dalymount Park. On 4 October 2016 Shelbourne announced that they would leave Tolka Park for a newly refurbished Dalymount Park. In April 2021, the Dalymount redevelopment was expected to conclude by 2025.

A local campaign called 'Save Tolka Park' was set up with the aim to secure the future of the stadium and prevent the stadium from being demolished. In February 2022, the city council agreed to examine the feasibility of the sale of the stadium back to Shelbourne.

Transportation

Public transit
Tolka Park is served by Irish Rail commuter services that stop at Drumcondra, on routes to and from Dublin Connolly serving M3 Parkway, Maynooth, and Hazelhatch/Celbridge.

See also

List of rugby league stadiums by capacity

References

External links
 Shelbourne Tolka Park The Dublin Groundhop Stadium video tour

Drumcondra, Dublin
Association football venues in the Republic of Ireland
Republic of Ireland national football team home stadiums
Rugby league stadiums in Ireland
Rugby League World Cup stadiums
Sports venues in Dublin (city)
Home Farm F.C.
Shamrock Rovers F.C.
Shelbourne F.C.
Drumcondra F.C.
Association football venues in County Dublin
Dolphin F.C.